The Bafuliiru people (also known as the Fuliiru, Bafuliru, Kifuliru, Kifuliiru, Bafuliru, Bafuliiru and Bafuliru) are a Bantu ethnic group, a sub-group of the Kivu.

The Furiiru mainly inhabit the east-central highlands of the Democratic Republic of the Congo (Zaire), in the South Kivu province south of Lake Kivu and north and northwest of Uvira, along the Ruzizi plain near the border with Rwanda and Burundi, where some Furiiru also live. In 2009, their population estimate numbered over 250,000. A 1999 estimate of Furiiru-language speakers placed the number at 300,000.

Clans of the Bafuliru 
The Bafuliiru are not a homogeneous people. Rather, it is an amalgamation of people of diverse origins, a kind of multicultural state, with six distinct origins.   

To be a Mufuliiru (the singular of Bafuliiru), one must belong by birth to one of the thirty seven families (clans) founder of the ethnic group.  

The Bafuliiru people are made up of about 37 clans which are:

 Badaka
 Badjoga
 Bahatu
 Bahamba (a clan, which comes from a royal family. The Bufuliru chiefdom was led by the Batumba and Balemera clan, but the Bahamba had taken the authority from the Batumba. Thus the Batumba remained as a clan)

 Bahange
 Bahembwe
 Bahofwa
 Bahundja
 Bahungu, (or Bazige) Hutu people, originally from Burundi. 
 Baiga
 Bajojo
 Bakame
 Bakukulugu
 Bakuvi
 Balambo (It is also a major clan within the Bavira ethnicity)
 Balemera
 Balizi, Bantu ethnic group originally from Bunyoro in Uganda. Their chiefs began to move their people eastward and southeastward toward the rich arable areas of Uvira in the early 19th century. The clan was absorbed and became part of the Fuliiru clan.
 Bamioni
 Banakatanda, one of the most powerful clans in Bafuliiru. On the royal court, a role was assigned to each powerful clan of the kingdom. The women of the Banyakatanda were kingmakers. A king could be born to any wife of the king and the Banyakatanda women were midwives in the service of the queens and had to announce whether the child was worthy of succession to the throne. On the King's death, only the members of these clans could confirm and announce the death and ensure that the child worthy of succession acceded to the throne.
 Banakyoyo
 Banamubamba
 Banamuganga
 Basamba
 Bashagakibone
 Bashimbi, Nilotic people originating from the Bacwezi Kingdom in Uganda. The Bashimbi were absorbed into various Fuliiru groups, and there was endogamy between the clan and the remaining Fuliiru population. This high level of intermarriage and exchange would continue throughout history. As a result, many have become subsistence Bantu farmers, growing grains and raising sheep, cattle, and fowl.
 Bashale
 Bashamwa
 Bashashu
 Basigi
 Basira
 Basozo, Hutu people originally from Bugarama in Rwanda; mixed with the rest of the population so much that this clan was snuffed out, although it still exists. 
 Bashago
 Batere
 Batoké
 Batumba: A royal clan and a prominent clan among the Bavira and the Bafuliru. In Rwindi, it is the Mutumba who is on the throne and in the Province of Haut-Lomami in the former Katanga. The Mutumba has always been the most respected people. And in the territory of Uvira, he is the most numerous clan
 Bavunye
 Bavurati and
 Bazilangwe

Bafuliru chiefdom 

At the beginning of Belgian colonization, the basic unit of colonization, the general trend of which was the policy of decentralization, was the chiefdom. Chieftaincies were therefore established in due respect of the customs and the traditions of each area, particularly on the basis of 3 principal criteria defined and established by the Belgian colonial administration as comprising the conditions sine qua non for the establishment of any chieftaincy and, in order to avoid, on one hand, lawlessness, and, on the other hand, the violation of the ancestral realities that have survived for millennia. Each ethnic group, however small, was assigned a chiefdom or a sector, if not, a grouping. The administrative territories were thus constituted within the limits of the chiefdom. The concern to regroup “ethnic units” in their own geographical entities led to such fragmentation that Province Orientale, which included the present Province Orientale (Haut-Congo) and the former Kivu, comprised up to 2,500 chiefdoms and groups. 

The Babembe and the Babuyu were grouped in the territory of Fizi, which was subdivided by the colonial administration in five sectors, namely, Itombwe, Lulenge, Mutambala, Ndandja, and Tanganyika.

Bafuliiru community-chiefdom, by contrast, forms a boundary with Rwanda and Burundi through the Ruzizi plain. The soil of the plain is sandy, which allows the cultivation of groundnuts and cotton, especially in Luvungi, Lubarika and Luberizi.

As for the plateau, the Bafuliiru collectivity has two types of plateau: the Middle Plateau and the High Plateau. The Middle Plateau is situated between Luvungi and Mulenge where the attitude varies progressively between 100 m and 1800 meters. The Middle Plateaus consists of the following villages: Namutiri, Ndolera, Bulaga, Langala, Bushokw, Bushuju, Butole, Lemera, Bwesho, Katala, Mulenge, etc.

The Middle Plateau is a favorable environment for growing cassava, coffee, banana, beans and maize.

On the other hand, the third set of the relief of the Bafuliiru chieftaincy is composed of High Plateaus, which are part of the Mitumba chain. The High Plateaus form a watershed between the tributaries of the Ulindi and the Elila and torrents that flow into the Ruzizi River and Tanganyika.

The “Chefferie” of Bafuliru, the second and last chefferie in the Uvira territory, is composed of five groupements: Runingu, Itara, Lemera, Muhungu and Kigoma. Each groupements are composed of a certain number of villages. 

The groupement/locality of Muhungu consists of the following villages:
 Kabondola, 
 Kagunga, 
 Kaholwa, 
 Kalemba, 
 Kasheke, 
 Kaluzi, 
 Kazimwe, 
 Kibumbu, 
 Kasanga, 
 Kihanda, 
 Mukololo, 
 Lugwaja, 
 Masango, 
 Muzinda, 
 Muhungu, 
 Namukanga,
 Kiriba,
 Butaho,
 Kahwizi,

The groupement/locality of Kigoma consists of the following villages:

 Bibangwa, 
 Bikenge, 
 Kukanga, 
 Bushajaga, 
 Kahungwe, 
 Butumba, 
 Kabere, 
 Karava, 
 Kalengera, 
 Kahololo, 
 Kalimba, 
 Karaguza, 
 Kahungwe, 
 Kasheke, 
 Kiryama, 
 Kanga, 
 Kashagala, 
 Kasenya, 
 Kishugwe, 
 Kigoma, 
 Lubembe, 
 Kihinga, 
 Mangwa, 
 Miduga, 
 Kitembe, 
 Mibere, 
 Kitija, 
 Muhanga, 
 Kabamba, 
 Mulenge, 
 Kaduma, 
 Mushojo, 
 Masango, 
 Kitoga, 
 Mashuba, 
 Mulama, 
 Kagaragara, 
 Ndegu, 
 Rurambira, 
 Rugeje, 
 Rubuga, 
 Rusako, 
 Sogoti, 
 Taba, 
 Sange, 
 Kabunambo,

The groupement/locality of Runingu consists of the following villages:

 Katembo, 
 Kashatu, 
 Ruhito, 
 Ruhuha, 
 Namuziba, 
 Kasambura, 
 Katwenge, 
 Bulindwe, 
 Narumoka, 
 Kalindwe,

The groupement/locality of Itara consists of the following villages:

 Bwegera 
 Luvungi 
 Lubarika 
 Kakamba 
 Murunga 
 Ndolera 
 Katogota 
 Luberizi 
 Bulaga 
 Luburule 
 Bideka

The groupement/locality of Lemera consists of the following villages:

 Kiringye 
 Kidote 
 Langala 
 Bwesho 
 Mahungu or Mahungubwe 
 Narunanga 
 Namutiri 
 Lungutu 
 Kahanda 
 Kigurwe 
 Ndunda

History

Origin 
The Bafuliiru people originated from West-Central Africa as part of the Bantu Migration to Central, Eastern and Southern Africa. Most, however, are descended from Bantu groups that had settled in Southeast Africa after the initial expansion from Nigeria/Cameroon. In the early 1500s, the ancestors of Bafuliiru, Bavira, Warega, and Babembe began to move eastward into the richer foothills of North Kivu and South Kivu. By the early 1600s, they were concentrated at Luindi, a locality situated nearby to Kikoma in South Kivu. Traditionally the Furiiru were the only highland Bantu people to be organized into a "single, relatively small state" which was highly centralized. Kahambalingishi, the founder of the Bafuliiru chiefdom arrived in the region around the 16th century. Bishikwabo Chubaka, an illustrious Shi historian, states that Bafuliiru and Bavira occupied Uvira after they migrated from Luindi.

Eponym and controversies on chiefdoms 
The provenance of the Bafuliiru chiefdom is a matter of political and academic debates which fuel political clashes at the local level. 

Alfred Moeller de Laddersous, the colonial administrator and governor of Orientale Province who had extensively studied the Bantu people of the eastern part of the Belgian Congo, estimates that Bahamba (Wahamba) came from the Luindi direction towards current Uvira and changed their eponym from Wahamba to Bafuliiru. Moeller present Bahamba as a clan to which belong to the founders of the customary “Bafuliro” chiefdom.

According to René Loons, a Belgian colonial administrator, the Bafuliiru (sometimes considered a region rather than an ethnic group) comprises four main fractions: Bahamba, Batumba, Banakatanda and Batumba. More precisely, Loons confirms that the four fractions composing the territory of Bafuliiru were organized into distinct traditional chiefdoms. However, the Bahamba fraction dominated the other fractions and held the management of the extended “Bafuliru” customary chiefdom. Loons further states that the Bahamba clan had been led by their chief Kikanwe to present-day Uvira territory. In the same sequel, Kingwengwe Mupe, a Fuliiru historian and political analyst, considers that the Bahamba clan occupied Uvira after having driven out (and possibly dethroned) the Balemera clan. According to Mupe, the Balemera clan were the first occupant of the region, which would be regarded as the chiefdom of Bafuliru, more precisely Lemera, a village nearby to Kasheke and Nyambasha. Even though Bafuliiru seem to have repelled Bavira, Moeller presents ‘Bafuliro’ in an inconsistent style as the first occupants of the region called ‘Bufulero’.

While Loons indicate that Kahambalingishi, the founder of the Bafuliiru chiefdom is the descendant of Kikanwe and/or Namboko, Chubaka brings a version that arouses more suspicion. Chubaka links Kahamba to Mulemera, whom he believes to be the father and founder of the Bahamba dynasty. According to Chubaka, the main town of the Bahamba chiefdom which is Lemera refers to its founder who is Mulemera. Consequently, Mulemera is seen by Chubaka as the real founder of the Bafuliiru chiefdom. Chubaka and Mupe tends to corroborate certain local accounts which would affirm that the Balemera clan were the first occupants of the part occupied by the Bafuliiru chiefdom.

The 17th-Century 
Following their arrival in Uvira in the 17th century, the Fuliiru chiefs began to move their people eastward and southeastward to the rich arable areas and absorbed the Bambuti pygmies, whom they called “Wambotte” and whom they employ as varlets and huntsmen. The Bafuliiru brought agriculture, iron weaponry, and governance-style with them throughout Uvira and were always on the road, assimilating any populations they came across and the rest were absorbed into the various Fuliiru groups. The Fuliiru have always been happy to adapt and, in terms of territorial expansion, were by far the most successful of the groups that had originally migrated south from the Luindi River, relying on a combination of land purchases, blood-brotherhood (partnerships), intermarriage with other people, and their adoption and absorption. Most of the other hunter-gatherers they encountered, soon adopted the agricultural, sedentary lifestyle and even the languages of the these Bantu farmers. As the land was fertile and ideally suited to agriculture, the population increased rapidly, causing further waves of migration to more fertile land in a landscape which had powerful flowing rivers. These agriculturalists arrivals put more pressure on the Bambuti communities and were faced with the stark choice of either integrating or moving on. Clans consisted of patriarchal social units and the chiefdoms were ruled over by the most powerful clan.

Barundi and Banyarwanda migration to Bafuliiru territories 
In the late nineteenth century, many different groups settled on Bafuliiru's lands in search of greener pastures. The Barundi arrived later under chief Ngabwe of the Bazige clan coming from Burundi. They asked the Bavira for lands and obtained them between the Kiliba and Kawezi rivers in exchange for ivory. The waves defined by the colonists quickly brought wars of expansion on both sides. The Mwami of the Bafuliiru considered the villages where the Mwami of the plain rules still belonged to him. For the Mwami of the plain, he had to know the villages over which he was to reign. Only one alternative was possible, to wage war between the two sister chiefdoms. The strongest had to prevail.

Chief Kinyoni, a subchief of Burundian King Mwezi Gisabo from the Banyakarama Dynasty, established himself with his followers on the right bank of the Ruzizi River. Chief Kinyoni launched an attack in a southerly direction of the community of Bafuliiru. It occupies the villages of Kigoma, Mulenge, Kihanga, and Kalengera. The localities were rapidly occupied since the Bafuliiru of Nyamugira were not yet organized. However, the soldiers were armed with spears, knives, arrows, machetes, and axes on both sides.

Following his victory in the south, Chief Kinyoni launched another attack northward, occupying the villages of Kiringye, Kabwiba, and Kigwena. His army was led by a warrior known as Rubisha. At that time, half of the Bafuliiru community was already occupied by Kinyoni. Consequently, he had only to take Bwesho to enter Lemera, the capital of the Bafuliiru chieftainship. The Bafuliiru reorganized under the leadership of Katangaza, a notable from Bwesho. The Bafuliiru army awaited Rubisha in Bwesho. Suddenly, Rubisha was lashed out by a spear in Bwesho and died later of his wounds. His men were driven from every village, but they retreated to Luvungi, where Bafuliiru’s troops later expelled them; they established themselves at Kiringye, where they received the support from the Belgian colonists. The villages remain under the control of the Ruzizi plain until today, including others located east of the Bukavu-Uvira road as far as Sange.

The Banyarwanda (whom are now termed as “Banyamulenge”) also appeared during the European penetration. The term “Banyarwanda” designates indistinctly the Hutus, the Tutsis and the Twa of Rwanda. They have the same common language, namely Kinyarwanda, as well as the same cultural references. It was a real feudal system that wanted the class of Hutus to leave their land available to the class of Tutsis, who could thus graze their cows.

There were clientelistic relations between the two classes, the Tutsis lending their cows to the Hutus who, themselves, had to lend their land in exchange. In this feudal system, the cow represented the attribute of wealth.

The richest of the Tutsis had the largest herds. At the top of this social organization, was the king called “Mwami” endowed with divine powers and embodying national unity. The king surrounded himself with Tutsi warlords but also with Hutu advisers who managed the distribution of the land. Over time, the Tutsis established the system of serfdom making the Hutu the subject par excellence of the Tutsi; the Belgian colonial domination will formalize and freeze this social system which will end up being apprehended as an ethnic divide between the Hutus and the Tutsis.

Between 1935 and 1955, Belgium, a colonial power in the Belgian Congo, having at the same time guardianship over Rwanda and Burundi, had greatly and officially favored the immigration of Rwandans to Kivu.

According to René Lemarchand, a French-American political scientist, the ancestors of Banyarwanda were:"renegades from Rwanda. Having fallen foul of the ruling Niginya dynasty, they moved to the Itombwe area in the late 19th century. Others followed, in search of greener pastures, some from Rwanda, others from Burundi. Although they formed a culturally and linguistically distinct community, their name never appears in colonial records" Unusually in contacts with the Tutsi pastoralists from Banyarwanda group, the Bafuliiru were neither conquered nor assimilated by them, but instead engaged in trade (as well as sporadic cattle raiding), which led to a deep and long-lasting social interaction which especially affected the Bafuliiru. Banyarwanda later obtained Mulenge, Upper Sange from the Bafulero. Incidentally, they dispersed all over the country to settle in the most inaccessible areas, settling in Kalamba, on the Ruzizi plain and in the Mulenge hills, whence they had spread to other parts of southern Kivu. The administrative service at the time in charge of this operation was called the Mission d'immigration des Banyarwanda (MIB), it later became the Mission d'Immigration de la Population (MIP). During this period, the Belgian colonial authority established tens of thousands of Rwandan families in the current Masisi zone, in the current Bwito community in the Rutshuru zone, in the Buzi-Ziralo grouping in the Kalehe zone and in Moba in Katanga. Other eastern regions of Congo-Zaire such as Baraka and Marungu was prepared to welcome others.

On the other hand, another factor that favored this immigration of Rwandans was the recruitment of labor by the colonial authority since 1926, on behalf of the large mining companies in Katanga such as the Union Minière du Haut-Katanga (UMHK) and Kivu, mainly in Kalima and Kamituga. Very often hired under contract, Rwandan workers did not renounced their nationality or their property which remained in Rwanda.

The creation of a chiefdom for the Banyarwanda came only after the importation of the abundant labor that the missionaries of Rutshuru brought with them from neighboring Rwanda. This historical event was recognized and admitted by Monsignor Faustin Ngabu, then president of the Episcopate of Congo and bishop of the diocese of Goma, in his Easter pastoral letter of April 11, 1998 (French: Lettre Pastorale du 11 avril 1998).

In the letter, he stated:"With us, the main tribes or socio-political communities are called, I quote in alphabetical order: Bahavu, Bahunde, Banande, Banyanga, Barega, Bashi, Batembo. The Banyarwanda (Hutus and Tutsis), at least those who were, those who no longer want this title and those who still identify with this term, will want to understand that, in their case, the notion of “tribe” that they give themselves when they declare themselves Hutu and Tutsi cannot be understood in the same sense as that of the other communities mentioned above. Indeed, unlike that of the Hutus and Tutsis, the Havu, Hunde, Nande, Nyanga and Tembo communities each have their "Mwami" and their "Balu" or "Vakama", who are respectively their heads of state and leading executives in the precolonial context. These communities have their traditional values which are based on their languages, their territories, their customs and their own family, matrimonial, cultural, economic, political and religious organizations. For the case of Hutus and Tutsis, after 23 years already spent in this diocese, I am not able to say the same; how does each of these two Hutu and Tutsi groups constitute a tribe? It is up to them to understand it and convince others of it."From 1920, the colonial administration began to create "atypical chiefdoms" to bring together the Rwandophone populations who immigrated to the Congo. These are the chiefdom of Bwisha (south of Rutshuru), the chiefdom of the enclave of Gishari (Masisi) and the Hunde chiefdom of Bukulu (north of Goma).

The particular case of the children of Bwisha (South of Rutchuru) 
Bwisha chiefdom was made up of seven groups, namely Jomba, Busanza, Binza, Bweza, Bukoma, Gisari and Rugari. Monsignor P. Kanyamachumbi, a well-known Rwandan historian, affirms that: "before and after King Kigeri IV Rwabugiri (note: this king, son and successor of mwami Mutare II Rwogera, reigned from approximately 1860 to 1895), the other kings of Rwanda have never administered this land and their authority has never been exercised”.After the relegation of the Hunde chief Bakimiro, the Belgian colonizer appointed in June 1919, the very first Hutu Rwandophone chief, in his place and in flagrant violation of the traditional practices hitherto in force. The chief was known as mwami Daniel Ndeze Rugabo II. It was officially invested, on January 1, 1920, by the district commissioner of Kivu, Mr. Ernest Le Docte.

The case of the "Gishari enclave" chiefdom in Masisi 
The Belgian colonial administration forcibly bought the land of Gishari enclave from Bahunde chiefs in 1939, to settle the Rwandophone immigrants. Gradually, the Rwandophone migrants who had become more numerous had tried, five years later, to extend the territory under their control, provoking a strong reaction from the indigenous customary chiefs.

Thus, in 1957, the colonial power abolished the Gishari chiefdom and the Hunde recovered their land and obtained its reintegration into the Hunde chiefdom of Kishali. The enclave of Gishari, an entity created from scratch by the Belgian colonizer, lasted seventeen years.

The case of the Hunde chiefdom of Bukumu, North of Goma 
The traditional Hunde entity had a very mixed population of Tutsi and Hutu ethnic groups on the territory of the colony, but the latter are rather indicated in Rwanda-Urundi, territory under Belgian mandate. In the same vein, the Belgian archivist EJ Vandewoode had driven home the point by publishing in 1939 the documents relating to the former Kivu, from 1870 to 1918, in which he listed the following tribes of the Kivu district: Baholoholo, Balembe, Bagoma, Babwari, Babove, Babembe, Bavira, Bafuliru, Bashi, Bahavu, Wanianga, Bashu, Baswagha and Baamba. Unfortunately, no mention is made of the Hutu and Tutsi ethnic groups, yet, Nilotic groups like the Alur, the Kakwa and the Hima are clearly indicated as being established tribes in the Belgian Congo.

The marginalization of Fuliiru communities 

Since the 1960s, problems of the cohabitation between the Banyarwanda and their Congolese neighbors have resulted in serious social tensions and violence. The social tensions and violence that have escalated into lethal conflict situations of a social, cultural, economic, and security character with very complex consequences. According to human rights organizations, the total number of the dead has been estimated at about 70,0005 in 1996. 

The conflict in Fuliiru communities, has its origin in the fact that the Rwandan refugees who were settled by the United Nation in the eastern part of Democratic Republic of Congo, have forsaken their given status when they first came, and having invented an entirely fabricated ethnogenesis, started by proclaiming themselves to be “Banyamulenge” (literally ‘those who live in Mulenge’).  

After the independence of the Congo in the 1960, the Banyarwanda (Tutsi and Hutu alike) tried to force a local recognition of their rights as “indigenous” on the basis that they had two “chefferies” which were ascertained to have never existed by other ethnic groups. By adopting the concept of “indigenous of Mulenge”, the Tutsi argued they migrated into Congo Basin around the same times as their counterparts Fuliiru, Vira, Bembe and Lega before the Congo Free State and are entitled to the same ethnic rights like every other tribes in the country.  

Thus, in 1976, Faustin Tabazi Rugama, a Banyamulenge writer, tried to give credential to the idea of a tribe called  “Banyamulenge” that might have existed prior to the Berlin Conference in 1885. This allegedly “historical and scientific” clothing unlikely meant to equate the pseudo-tribe of “Banyamulenge” with the original and native Congolese tribes. Under the insistence of Gisaro Muhoza, a Rwandan university administrator and the inventor of the term “Banyamulenge”, became the father-in- law of Bizima Karaha, leading Faustin Tabazi Rugama using the term “Banyamulenge” in his thesis. According to historians, the Banyamulenge are populations of Rwandan origin who had settled in South Kivu and were never known by this name during the colonial period. Using “Banyamulenge” as ethnic identity, they set out to demand Congolese citizenship as well as land that belonged to the autochthonous Congolese populations. 

In the early stages of the Second Congo War, thousands of "Banyamulenge" crossed into Bafuliiru communities to support the Tutsis of the Alliance of Democratic Forces for the Liberation of Congo-Zaire (AFDLC) and help them drive the local chiefs and civilians out of their lands. On October 1998, a large number of civilians in Uvira were brutally murdered or displaced, including the former Mulenge post chief, Ladislas Matalambu, who was killed on October 1, 1998 at 7:30 p.m. Incidentally, Alexis Deyidedi, former administrative secretary of the Bafulero chiefdom, was assassinated on October 2, 1998 at 11 p.m. AFDL troops forced many Bafuliiru, Babembe, Warega, and Bavira to flee and in turn take refuge in neighboring countries, such as, Burundi, Tanzania, Uganda, Kenya, Zambia and Mozambique. 
On 10 June 2004, up to 3,500 Congolese, mostly Bafuliiru and Babembe, fled to Burundi, fleeing ethnic persecution.

In June 2014, 35 Fuliiru were killed in an attack on the town of Mutarule. The attack was believed to be ethnically motivated. The massacres were carried out mainly by Barundi and Banyamulenge rebel groups in a determined, planned, systematic and methodical manner, and were inspired by ethnic hatred.

In January 2019, Twigwaneho and Ngumino, a Banyamulenge rebel groups, reportedly torched homes and property belonging to the Bafuliiru in the village of Babengwa. 

Between February 2019 and 2020, a large number of Bafuliiru were killed and displaced, leading them to the Bijombo camp in the South Kivu province, east of the Democratic Republic of Congo. Despite efforts to prioritize and act on serious cases in the immediate aftermath of the ethnic violence, there have been few prosecutions and fewer convictions, as well as a near total lack of investigations of those who organized and financed the violence.

Language 
The Fuliiru speak the Fuliiru language, a Bantu language. The Furiiru are connected to the Vira in a Furiiru-Vira culture cluster. Both groups are interlacustrine, living between the African Great Lakes. Kifuliiru is the most widely spoken language in Uvira. It is estimated that Fuliiru has 60% lexical similarity with Kinyarwanda; 63% with Kirundi, and 80% with Shi language. More than half of the Uvira population are able to understand it. Many Fuliiru people also speak French, English, Lingala, Portuguese, Tshiluba, and Swahili.

Economy 

The Bafuliiru economy is almost exclusively agriculturally based, although they also own and raise cattle for milk and meat; their homelands in the South Kivu province are some of the most intensively farmed areas of the country. More than 90% of the population makes its livelihood by producing food crops or through industrial work involving the processing of crops. Agriculture contributes more than 19.04% of the nation’s GDP. The most fertile agricultural areas in the country are the mountain regions forming the Congo-Nile watershed and the central plateau, where two crops can normally be harvested each year. Principal food crops include cassava, corn, rice, plantains, and, to a lesser extent, bananas, beans, and peanuts. Principal export crops include coffee, cocoa, and palm oil. Many Fuliiru have also become involved in business and politics (former government Minister and member, Justin Bitakwira, is Mfuliiru).

Manioc 
According to oral tradition, Cassava came from Lwindi and was brought by the Bafuliiru during their migration. Cassava is the staple food of the Bafuliiru populations in general, particularly those of the Ruzizi plain and the Bafuliiru community as a whole. Among Bafuliiru, having a cassava field is a treasure trove. Its leaves are also edible; its stems are used for wood. 

Cassava plays an essential role in the proper functioning of the administration of the community. 80% of all taxes levied come solely from cassava. This allows tax collectors to fill the state coffers at the community and zone levels, which also sends its taxes to the markets of the Bafuliiru community. At the provincial level, there is no requirement to demonstrate the role of cassava in the Bafuliiru community. In Uvira, trucks operate on Mondays, Wednesdays, and Fridays to purchase the Rubanga cassava from Rubanga, Luvungi, Luberizi, and Ndolera.

Banana 
The banana tree adapts almost everywhere in the Bafuliiru community. The banana tree plays a vital role in the custom. As for the cause, someone who wants to get married has to bring a jar of banana juice called in Kifuliiru: “I mbindi ya mavuyoKudeterakwo.” That is, “the jug of juice that will allow you to speak.” This means someone won’t be able to do anything serious without banana juice. Whether it is the wedding ceremony, or the end of mourning, the jug of banana juice must be presented to the assembly. The speaker cannot say anything of value otherwise. Consequently, banana juice has a customary meaning among the Bafuliiru, and behind each house, there is always a plantation of banana trees. In addition, Kasigisi, an alcoholic drink made from bananas and sorghum, is preserved for special occasions.

The banana tree also has a ritual value among the Bafuliiru at the time of childbirth; it indicates the place where the umbilical cord of certain children was buried.

Rice 
The rice grown in the Bufuliiru community belongs to the genus Oryza and Ozyresatira species. Its different varieties are IR5, L9, and IRON 282. Rice is more a source of income than food for the Bafuliiru at the CEP Kabwe, Kaliri, and at the Community Development Center (CDC) base in Kiringye. For the Bafuliiru, rice is a cultural export. Therefore, it is not consumed much, although it is produced sufficiently.

Bean 
Beans are grown in the center of Lemera from Rubanga to Mulenge. The plant is more suitable for the temperate climate of the altitude. Like rice, beans are also an export crop and sold for less since Mufuliiru are not accustomed to eating beans. For the bean meal, you must always have the cassava Foufou on the side. Beans from the Bafuliiru community are marketed in Bukavu and Uvira. Another quantity is exported to Burundi and Rwanda. In short, rice and beans, the food crops cultivated in the Bafuliiru community, are not consumed on a large scale. They are a secondary food among the Bafuliiru.

Corn 
Corn is cultivated throughout the community of Bafuliiru. It is grown in the Ruzizi plain, particularly in Luvungi and the Hauts Plateaux, where it is the staple food. Several inhabitants of the Hauts plateaux consume it. However, many Bafuliiru agriculturalists do not prefer corn.

Peanut 
It is cultivated chiefly in Luvungi and Lubarika. It can also be found in Lemera and Rubinga. Groundnuts from Bafuliiru are exported to Rwanda and Burundi. A further amount is sold in Bukavu.

Coffee 
It requires a temperature varying from 22° to 27°C over an altitude of 500 to 800m. Two species of coffee exist in the Bafuliiru community: Coffea arabica and robusta coffee. The arabica species is the most common in the community. It is a culture of exporting coffee to Burundi.

Housing 
Traditional Fuliiru houses are huts made from wood, reeds, and straw and are shaped like beehives. High hedges serve as fences. In recent years, modern houses have been built with modern materials.

Commercial trade 
Fuliiru crafts include pottery, woodwork, jewelry, metal work, and basket weaving.

Sexual division of production 
The main priorities of women are childbearing, childcare, and housework. However, in many rural areas, women also work in agriculture through planting because their fertility is believed to be transferred to the seeds. Women are never seen holding high, respected positions, and men handle most of the production of goods.

Religious belief 
Today most Fuliiru in Democratic Republic of Congo are Christians. However, some traditional beliefs survive. Traditionally, Bafuliiru believe in Supreme being and a distant Creator God called Rurema. He is considered the creator of everything on earth; he is invisible and elusive in the sky. On earth, Rurema is represented by priests from whom the Bafuliiru presented everything they found arduous. The most critical priests are Mushabo, Budisi, and Mugajalugulu.

Clothing 

In the past, Fuliiru wore skirts of cloth made from tree bark, and cloaks made of animal hides. These have long been replaced by Western-style clothing. However, handmade beaded necklaces and bracelets are still worn.

References

Ethnic groups in the Democratic Republic of the Congo